The Garypoidea are a superfamily of pseudoscorpions.  The superfamily contains seven families:

Garypidae
Garypinidae
Geogarypidae
Larcidae
Olpiidae
Menthidae 
Pseudochiriididae

References

 
Arachnid superfamilies